Mark Joseph Perry (born 1966) is an American economist, a professor of economics and finance in the School of Management at University of Michigan–Flint, and scholar at The American Enterprise Institute. He is also a member of the Board of Scholars for the Mackinac Center for Public Policy.

Education
Perry holds two graduate degrees in economics (M.A. and Ph.D.) from George Mason University and in addition has an MBA degree in finance from The University of Minnesota.

Men's rights activism
Perry has been active in campaigning against male sex discrimination under Title IX on US campuses since 2016. He claims to have filed over 100 complaints at universities across the US against affirmative action programs and female only scholarships for “illegal sex discrimination”, referring to himself as “one-man mission” to fix the programs.

In June 2016 Perry filed a complaint with the Michigan Department of Civil Rights seeking the closure of Michigan State University's Women's Lounge, alleging that having a private place for women to study on campus discriminated against men, and was a violation of civil rights. He claimed the female only facility was a violation of both the Michigan Civil Rights Initiative and the equal opportunity in education act Title IX. In July 2016, Michigan State University made the lounge a gender-neutral space to ensure compliance with Title IX.

In 2018 he was the recipient of the National Coalition for Men's Award for Excellence in the Advancement of Men’s Issues for his activism.

In 2020 he filed a complaint with the Department of Education’s Cleveland Office for Civil Rights, which led to Ohio State University restructuring eight programmes.

Economic analysis
He has written about gender issues, including differences in wage rates between men and women, for publications such as The Washington Post and The Wall Street Journal. He has been critical of how the difference in pay has been measured and the conclusions drawn. For example, he argues differences in hours worked, education and having children should be accounted for.

He has written that increasing the minimum wage may lead to job losses, criticizing a report by John Komlos who argued few jobs would be lost. Economist Jacob Vigdor later stated that Perry's analysis was carried out using faulty data; in response, Perry said "The jury is still out on the $15 minimum wage, [...] and it will take years to assess its impact. I'm simply pointing to some possible evidence in employment trends that might suggest that there is early evidence of some effects."

He criticised Obama's policies of demand market stimulation like the proposal of subsidizing electric and hybrid cars' sector, both for producers and consumers. Perry qualified public economic subsidies as a "boondoggle" and a severe market distortion, which would have been hindered the development of other alternative technologies such as hybrids and gasoline advanced engines.

He provides a chart (updated every 6 months) on his blog (https://www.aei.org/carpe-diem) showing the difference in price changes since 2000 in selected items tracked by the Bureau of Labor Statistics.  The chart has been cited by numerous sources as highlighting the difference between traded goods (e.g. televisions) and non-traded services (e.g. medical).

Selected publications

Notes

External links
 Profile at University of Michigan–Flint

1966 births
21st-century American economists
Carlson School of Management alumni
George Mason University alumni
Living people
Mackinac Center for Public Policy
University of Michigan faculty
Cornucopians